Phalonidia nicotiana is a species of moth of the family Tortricidae. It is found in China in the provinces of Heilongjiang and Liaoning.

The wingspan is about 12 mm.

References

Moths described in 1991
Phalonidia